Sheraden is a neighborhood in the West End of Pittsburgh, Pennsylvania in the United States. Nearby neighborhoods include Windgap, Chartiers City, Crafton Heights, Esplen, and Elliott.

The neighborhood was named for William Sheraden, a settler who gave land for the construction of a railroad depot in exchange for the naming rights. Sheraden's original homestead still stands at 2803 Bergman Street, easily distinguished for the two sycamore trees which grow together to form an arch, a legacy of Sheraden's horticulturalist grandson. Originally incorporated as Sheraden Borough in 1894, it grew quickly and was annexed by the City of Pittsburgh in 1907. Shortly thereafter, the Public School Board of Pittsburgh opened numerous educational facilities around Sheraden, including Langley High School, completed in 1923, which replaced the former borough's Riverview High School. 

Sheraden grew to become a hub for Irish and German immigrants to Pittsburgh. However, in the 70s when suburbia was coming up, the Irish and Germans moved from Sheraden into places like Robinson and even Crafton. Most of the Irish schoolchildren went to Holy Innocents grade school, which is currently closed along with its parish. Holy Innocents also had a high school.

Sheraden Park includes a swimming pool, tennis courts, ballfields, outdoor basketball courts and picnic and playground areas.

Education

Pittsburgh Public Schools operates public schools. Stevens Elementary School previously served Sheraden.

See also
 List of Pittsburgh neighborhoods

References

External links

Interactive Pittsburgh Neighborhoods Map

Neighborhoods in Pittsburgh